Cherise is another word for cherry.

Cherise can also refer to

 Cherise Adams-Burnett, a British vocalist, and winner of the 2020 Parliamentary Jazz Award for Jazz Vocalist of the Year 
 Cherise Roberts (born 1982), an English singer and songwriter
Cherise & Nadia, an English dance pop group featuring Cherise Roberts and Nadia Shepherd
 Cherise Willeit (born 1989), a South African professional road cyclist